Jacktown is a 1962 American film directed by William Martin.

Plot summary 

A young delinquent named Frankie gets arrested for statutory rape after being caught in flagrante with a fifteen-year-old girl in the back seat of his car.

He claims his innocence since he didn't know she was under age. Despite this, Frankie is convicted and sentenced to prison for 2 1/2 to 5 years. The sentence is to be served in Jackson State Prison (“Jacktown”) in Michigan.

Because of the crime he is convicted for, he is unpopular among the other prisoners. To release the tension his presence builds up in the correctional facility, Frankie is put on gardening duty in the warden living quarters.

While gardening, Frankie meets the warden's daughter, Margaret, and they  fall in love with each other. When the warden learns about Frankie's relation with his daughter he moves him to another position, as chauffeur outside the prison walls.

There is a prison riot inside while Frankie is outside driving a prisoner. The guard who is along on the ride is overpowered by the other prisoner and Frankie gets a chance to escape.

As a fugitive, Frankie goes to Margaret, but she convinces him to turn himself in, promising to wait for him until he is properly released and a free man.

Cast 
Patty McCormack as Margaret
Richard Meade as Frances "Frankie" Stossel
George Taylor as himself
Douglas Rutherford as Warden
Russ Paquette as Vince "Vinnie"
Mike Tancredi as Mike
Joanna Douglas as Mrs. Stossel
Gordon Grant as Lefty
John Anthony as Dutch
Joseph Julian as narrator
James Maley Sr. as Bailiff

Soundtrack

External links

See also
 List of American films of 1962

References

1962 films
1960s English-language films
American black-and-white films
American drama films
Films directed by William Martin
1962 drama films
1960s American films